The Miran gas field is an Iraqi natural gas field that was discovered in 2011. It will begin production in 2015 and will produce natural gas and condensates. The total proven reserves of the Miran gas field are around 12.3 trillion cubic feet (351×109m3) and production is slated to be around 500 million cubic feet/day (14.3×106m3).

References

Natural gas fields of Iraq